Eyvindur Y. Kang (born 23 June 1971) is an American composer and multi-instrumentalist. His primary instrument is viola, but has also performed on violin, tuba, keyboards and others.

In addition to his solo work, Kang has worked extensively with Bill Frisell and John Zorn.

Biography 
Eyvindur Y. Kang was born 23 June 1971 in Corvallis, Oregon, United States. Kang says his family heritage is "a mixture of Icelandic, Danish and Korean." He was raised in Canada and the United States, and has since lived and worked in countries ranging from Italy to Iceland. He studied piano and violin as a child, and as a teen played bass guitar in a reggae band.

A recurring theme in his solo work is the "NADE", the meaning of which Kang is not willing to disclose. Referring titles include "Theme from the first NADE", "5th NADE/Invisible Man", "Theme from the sixth NADE" (all three from the debut album 7 NADEs, 1996); "Jewel of the NADE", "Mystic NADE" (both from Theater of Mineral NADEs, 1998) and "Harbour of the NADE" (Virginal Co-ordinates, 2003). His preferred instrument is the viola.

In 2014 Kang visited Vossajazz in western Norway, for a gig with Bill Frisell's trio Beautiful Dreamers, including drummer Rudy Royston, for the opening concert. During the concert Norwegian trumpeter Arve Henriksen joined in for a tune.

Discography

Solo albums 
1996: Sweetness of Sickness (RGI Industries)
1996: 7 NADEs (Tzadik)
1998: Theater of Mineral NADEs (Tzadik)
2000: The Story of Iceland (Tzadik)
2002: Live Low To The Earth, In The Iron Age (Abduction)
2003: Virginal Co Ordinates (Ipecac)
2007: Athlantis (Ipecac)
2007: The Yelm Sessions (Tzadik)
2011: Visible Breath (Ideologic Organ)
2012: The Narrow Garden (Ipecac)
2012: Grass (Tzadik)
2019: Chirality (I dischi di angelica)
2020: Ajaeng Ajaeng
2021: Sonic Gnostic

Collaborations 
With Joe McPhee
1996: Common Threads (Deep Listening)

With Bill Frisell
1996: Quartet (Nonesuch)
2004: Unspeakable (Nonesuch)
2005: Richter 858 (Songlines)
2007: Floratone (Blue Note) with Floratone
2008: History, Mystery (Nonesuch) 
2010: Beautiful Dreamers (Savoy)
2010: Sign of Life: Music for 858 Quartet (Savoy Jazz)
2012: Floratone II (Savoy Jazz) with Floratone
2013: Big Sur (OKeh)
2016: When You Wish Upon a Star (Okeh)

With Wayne Horvitz
1998: 4+1 Ensemble (Intuition)
2001: From a Window (Avant)

With Dying Ground
1998: Dying Ground - Live at the Knitting Factory (Avant)

With Secret Chiefs 3
1998: Second Grand Constitution and Bylaws: Hurqalya (Amarillo)
1999: Eyes of Flesh, Eyes of Flame (Mimicry)
2001: Book M (Mimicry)
2004: Book of Horizons (Mimicry)

With Dylan van der Schyff and François Houle
1999: Pieces of Time (Line 4/Spool)

With Mr. Bungle
1999: California (Warner Bros.)

With Michael Bisio
2000: MBEK (Meniscus)

With Amir Koushkani
2001: In the Path of Love (Golbarg)

With Skúli Sverrisson & Hilmar Jensson
2002: Napoli 23 (Smekkleysa)

With Tucker Martine
2004: Orchestra Dim Bridges (Conduit)

With Billy Martin & Socket
2005: January 14 & 15, 2005 (Amulet)

With Jessika Kenney
2005: Aestuarium (Endless)
2012: The Face of the Earth (Ideologic Organ)
2016: Reverse Tree

With John Zorn
2014: Alastor: Book of Angels Volume 21 (Tzadik)

With Jessika Kenney and Hyeonhee Park
2014: At Temple Gate (Weyrd Son Records)

Guest appearances 

 String arrangements for Blonde Redhead - Misery Is a Butterfly (2004)
Animal Collective - Feels (2005)
Alvarius B - "Blood Operatives of the Barium Sunset"(2005)
various projects with Bill Frisell's Quartet
various projects with Sun City Girls
The Decemberists - The Crane Wife (2006)
Sunn O))) & Boris - Altar (2006) - Songs "The Sinking Belle (Black Sheep)", "The Sinking Belle (White Sheep)"
Thilges - "La Double Absence" (2007)
 Sunn O))) - Monoliths & Dimensions
Six Organs Of Admittance - Luminous Night(2009)
 Rahim AlHaj "Fly Away" (2010)
Alvarius B - "Baroque Primitiva"(2011)
Ensemble Pearl - "Ensemble Pearl" (2013)
The Invisible Hands - "Teslam" (2014)

References 

Zorn, John, ed. (2000). Arcana: Musicians on Music. New York: Granary Books/Hips Road. .

External links 
Biography at Ipecac Records

American jazz composers
American male violinists
American jazz violinists
1971 births
Living people
Musicians from Corvallis, Oregon
Musicians from Seattle
Tzadik Records artists
Cornish College of the Arts alumni
Ipecac Recordings artists
21st-century American violinists
American male jazz composers
21st-century American male musicians
American jazz violists
21st-century violists